Hans-Georg Beyer (born 3 September 1956 in Eisenhüttenstadt) is a former East German handball player who competed in the 1980 Summer Olympics.

He was a member of the East German handball team which won the gold medal. He played five matches and scored fourteen goals.

He is the brother of Gisela Beyer and Udo Beyer.

References

External links
profile

1956 births
Living people
Sportspeople from Eisenhüttenstadt
People from Bezirk Frankfurt
German male handball players
Olympic handball players of East Germany
Handball players at the 1980 Summer Olympics
Olympic gold medalists for East Germany
Olympic medalists in handball
Medalists at the 1980 Summer Olympics
Recipients of the Patriotic Order of Merit in silver